The Colclough Baronetcy, of Tintern Abbey, County Wexford, was created in the baronetage of Ireland on 21 July 1628 for Adam Colclough, High Sheriff of Wexford in 1630.

The family seat was Tintern Abbey (County Wexford) and its lands, which were granted in 1575 to Anthony Colclough from Staffordshire, an officer in Henry VIII's army, after the dissolution of the monasteries. After the death of the third baronet, the estate passed to the Leigh-Colclough (formerly Leigh) family.

Colclough baronets of Tintern Abbey (1628)
 Sir Adam Colclough, 1st Baronet (–1637)
 Sir Caesar Colclough, 2nd Baronet (1624–1684)
 Sir Caesar Colclough, 3rd Baronet (c. 1650–1687). Baronetcy extinct on his death.

References

Extinct baronetcies in the Baronetage of Ireland